Harbrinkhoek is a village in the Dutch province of Overijssel. It is a part of the municipality of Tubbergen, and lies about 5 km northeast of Almelo.

It was first mentioned in 1844 as Harbrink, and means "settlement of the people of Harbert (person)". In the 1950s, the hamlet turned into a little village. The village is twinned with Mariaparochie, but both still have separate place name signs, statistical entries and postal codes.

References

Populated places in Overijssel
Tubbergen